The Shadow Secretary of State for Northern Ireland is a member of the British Shadow Cabinet responsible for the scrutiny of the Secretary of State for Northern Ireland and their department, the Northern Ireland Office. The post is currently held by Peter Kyle.

Until recently there had been a 'bi-partisan' attitude to Northern Ireland affairs in the House of Commons but the role is influenced by the relationship between the main Official Opposition and parties in the country. The Conservative Party, for example, generally supports the unionist cause and in 2008 re-formalised a (since ended) link with the Ulster Unionist Party and relied on the support of the Democratic Unionist Party until the 2019 United Kingdom General Election in the House of Commons, while Labour has traditionally supported Irish nationalism and is loosely allied to the Social Democratic and Labour Party (SDLP). The Liberal Democrats are linked with the cross-community Alliance Party.

Shadow Secretaries of State

See also 

 Secretary of State for Northern Ireland
 Northern Ireland Office
 UK Shadow Cabinet 
 Liberal Democrat Frontbench Team
 Northern Ireland Affairs Committee
 Northern Ireland Grand Committee

References

External links 
 Conservative Northern Ireland branch
 Conservative Northern Ireland news
 Conservative Northern Ireland Education Spokesman
 David Lidington MP
 Lembit Öpik MP

Official Opposition (United Kingdom)
Government of Northern Ireland